Between March and July 1962, a radiation incident in Mexico City occurred when a ten-year-old boy took home an industrial radiography source that was not contained in its proper shielding. Five individuals received significant overdoses of radiation from the 5-Ci cobalt-60 capsule, four of whom died.

Reports differ as to the source's provenance: it was either found in a dump, found in a field, or was already in the house's yard when the affected family moved in and "was left to the family to keep and watch without any of the members of the family knowing exactly what the container was".

The boy is believed to have obtained the source some time after moving into the house on March 21. He kept it in his trouser pocket for several days. On April 1, his mother placed it in the kitchen cabinet of their home, where it remained until July 22. The boy died on April 29. Subsequently, his mother – six months pregnant at the time – died on July 19; his two-year-old sister died on August 18; and his paternal grandmother, who had been living with the family since April 17, died on October 15 that year. The boy's father also received a significant radiation dose; he survived, however, presumably because he worked outside the home and his exposure was lower.

See also
 Ciudad Juárez cobalt-60 contamination incident
 1990 Clinic of Zaragoza radiotherapy accident
 Goiânia accident
 List of civilian radiation accidents
 Nuclear and radiation accidents and incidents
 Nuclear safety and security

References

Health disasters in Mexico
Man-made disasters in Mexico
1962 in Mexico
1962 disasters in Mexico
1962 health disasters
Mexico City
March 1962 events in Mexico